Charlotte of Albret (1480 – 11 March 1514), Dame de Châlus, was a wealthy French noblewoman of the Albret family. She was the sister of King John III of Navarre and the wife of the widely notorious Cesare Borgia, whom she married in 1499. She was the mother of his only legitimate child, Louise Borgia, to whom she acted as regent of the Duchy of Valentinois following the death of Cesare from 1507-1514.

Family 
Charlotte was born in 1480, the daughter of Alain I of Albret, Lord of Albret, and Frances, Countess of Périgord. Her paternal grandparents were Jean d'Albret and Charlotte de Rohan, and her maternal grandparents were William, Viscount of Limoges and Isabelle de La Tour d'Auvergne, daughter of Bertrand V de La Tour, Count of Auvergne and Boulogne, and Jacquette du Peschin. Her paternal great-great-grandfather was Charles d'Albret, Constable of France, who was killed while commanding the French troops at the Battle of Agincourt in 1415. She had six siblings including John d'Albret, who became King of Navarre upon his marriage to Catherine of Navarre.

Marriage to Cesare Borgia 
On arrival to the throne, Louis XII of France intended to establish strong bonds with Brittany in order to incorporate it to the Kingdom of France, aiming to marry Anne of Brittany for the purpose; however, he was married by then to Joan of Valois. The Foix-Albret, led by Alain de Albret, feared a French takeover of Béarn, de facto sovereign, but claimed now by the French king.

The Navarrese monarchs Catherine and John started a rapprochement to Louis XII in order to appease his ambitions in Béarn, by supporting Louis XII in his attempt to marry the Breton princess. Louis XII demanded the annulment of her marriage to the Pope. The latter responded in kind by requiring a princess of royal blood to marry his son Cesare. The monarchs of Navarre proposed in turn Charlotte for the bargain.

The political move would get the monarchs Catherine and John peace of mind to the north of the Pyrenees, while at the same time establishing friendly diplomatic relations with Rome that could pave the way to solve their conflict over ecclesiastic appointments in Navarre, especially concerning the bishop of Pamplona Pallaviccini, a designation contested by the Navarrese monarchs. The conditions were set down on the contract of the wedding held in spring of 1499.

On 10 May 1499, at the age of 19 at Blois, Charlotte married Cesare Borgia, the notorious illegitimate son of Pope Alexander VI Borgia and Vannozza dei Cattanei. He had recently been created Duke of Valentinois by King Louis XII of France. The marriage was political, arranged with the purpose of strengthening Cesare's alliance with France. Cesare did not remain for long in the territories under the rule of the Foix-Albret, since he departed to Italy soon after the wedding and getting Charlotte pregnant, neither coming back to know his newborn daughter. Cesare accompanied King Louis in his invasion of Italy.

Charlotte was described as having been "beautiful and rich". In 1504, she became the owner of the properties of Feusines, Néret, and La Motte-Feuilly. Cesare and Charlotte had one daughter together:

 Louise Borgia, suo jure Dame de Châlus, suo jure Duchess of Valentinois (17 May 1500 – 1553), she first married on 7 April 1517 Louis II de la Trémoille, Governor of Burgundy; she married secondly on 3 February 1530, Philippe de Bourbon, Siegneur de Busset, by whom she had issue.

Cesare had at least eleven illegitimate children by various mistresses.

After escaping from a Spanish prison, Cesare died at the siege of Viana on 12 March 1507 in the service of Charlotte's brother, the king of Navarre with whom he had sought refuge. Following his death, Charlotte acted as regent for their only daughter, Louise, who had succeeded her father as Duchess of Valentinois. Almost seven years after Cesare's death, on 11 March 1514, at the Chateau of La Motte-Feuilly, Charlotte died. She was buried in a tomb at the church at La Motte-Feuilly.

As of the 21st century, there are many living descendants of Cesare Borgia and Charlotte of Albret, including Prince Sixtus Henry of Bourbon-Parma.

References

Sources
 

1480 births
1514 deaths
House of Borgia
Chalus, Lady of, Charlotte of Albret
House of Albret
Duchesses of Urbino
Dukes of Valentinois
16th-century women rulers